John W Du Bois is a professor of linguistics at University of California, Santa Barbara.

He is specialised in discourse and grammar, sociocultural linguistics, linguistic anthropology, spoken corpus linguistics, Mayan linguistics, English linguistics, and evolutionary linguistics.

Du Bois is a key figure in research on stance, dialogic syntax, argument structure, referential pragmatics and discourse representation. Du Bois is the Director of the Santa Barbara Corpus of Spoken American English, comprising transcriptions, audio, and timestamps which correlate transcription and audio at the level of individual intonation units.

Further reading 
2014 Du Bois, John W. "Towards a Dialogic Syntax". Cognitive Linguistics 25(3): 359–410.
2012 Du Bois, John W. & Kärkkäinen, Elise. "Taking a Stance on Emotion: Affect, Sequence, and Intersubjectivity in Dialogic Interaction". Text and Talk 32(4): 433–451.
2007 Du Bois, John W. "The Stance Triangle". Stancetaking in Discourse: Subjectivity, Evaluation, Interaction, ed. by Robert Englebretson, 139-182. Amsterdam: Benjamins.
2003 Du Bois, John W. "Discourse and Grammar". The New Psychology of Language: Cognitive and Functional Approaches to Language Structure, Vol. 2, ed. by Michael Tomasello, 47-87. London: Erlbaum.

References

External links
Google Scholar profile
John W. Du Bois (faculty member, UCSB Linguistics Dept.)
Santa Barbara Corpus of Spoken American English

Living people
University of California, Santa Barbara faculty
Linguists from the United States
Year of birth missing (living people)